6 km is a rural locality (a settlement) in Semigorodneye Rural Settlement of Kharovsky District, Russia. The population was 49 as of 2002.

Geography 
6 km is located 31 km south of Kharovsk (the district's administrative centre) by road. Semigorodnyaya is the nearest rural locality.

Streets 
There are no streets with titles.

References 

Rural localities in Kharovsky District